Edward Finlay was a college football player and referee. He played at the University of Virginia and Sewanee:The University of the South, a member of the latter's 1909 team. He played as an end, opposite Silas Williams.

References

Year of birth missing
Year of death missing
American football ends
College football officials
Sewanee Tigers football players
Virginia Cavaliers football players